There are five counties in the United States of America named Campbell County

 Campbell County, Kentucky
 Campbell County, South Dakota
 Campbell County, Tennessee
 Campbell County, Virginia
 Campbell County, Wyoming
Also:
 Campbell County, Georgia, a former county, part of Fulton County, Georgia since 1932